Adam McLean (born 7 July 1940) is an Irish boxer. He competed in the men's flyweight event at the 1960 Summer Olympics.

References

1940 births
Living people
Irish male boxers
Olympic boxers of Ireland
Boxers at the 1960 Summer Olympics
Boxers from Belfast
Flyweight boxers